Evelyn Kennedy (1915 – 1990) was a music editor for the Walt Disney Company, where she contributed to over 100 movies, including “Lady and the Tramp” (1955), “Sleeping Beauty” (1959), “The Jungle Book” (1967), “Mary Poppins” (1964), and “The Aristocats” (1970). She worked for Disney for the later part of the Golden age of American Animation in the era before the cheaper production techniques of animated television pushed into the spotlight.

Early life 
Evelyn Kennedy attended university at Amarillo School of Music in Amarillo Texas. She was a pupil of Lila Austin who had studied under E. Robert Schmitz and Joseph Lhevine. Evelyn Kennedy married Austen Myers on July 12, 1936 and became Evelyn Kennedy Myers. Kennedy was an accomplished pianist and accordionist, and began teaching early in her life. Kennedy would hold recitals for her students and she would also perform on the keys on stage. She followed her teacher Lila Austin in taking a teaching job at the Amarillo School of Music. At the start of World War II, Evelyn Kennedy joined the U.S Navy and was able to get a job as a stenographer typist for the Walt Disney Studios, where the production studios were being used to provide propaganda for the war effort. This proved to be a pathway into a future job with the Walt Disney Studios.

Career at Disney 
Because of the gender shift in the workforce during World War II, women were taking a larger role in the workplace. Breaking into the film industry, which was heavily male dominated, was difficult. But Evelyn Kennedy’s skill solidified her position. One of the first films she worked on was “Lady and the Tramp”, which earned an estimated $6.5 million in distributor rentals on its first release in 1955. As the music editor for the film, Kennedy played an integral role in the success of the project. Over the next three decades, Kennedy edited and compiled materials for over one hundred films and carried forward the momentum of Disney’s accomplishments. In an interview with Richard Sherman, he talks about his work-relationship with Evelyn Kennedy. “She was a bit older than me, so I was kind of like 'the kid' wandering around, but I was so interested in how she did it. She never let anybody [else] into her editing room where she worked with the Moviola – switching and pushing the film around to make it work. She had a little sign that said, 'Nobody can enter except Richard Sherman.' I was the one guy she would let come in. I was not supposed to talk, so I could just stand there and watch how she worked and how she did it. I was fascinated by it.... It was 'lessons' for me. I was learning so much in those days."

When talking about her job as a film music editor in 1982, Kennedy's only lament was that she "there were more openings for young people looking for a career".

List of works

References 

1915 births
1990 deaths
Walt Disney Animation Studios people
People from Amarillo, Texas